Johann Gottlieb Fleischer (15 October 1797 – 22 April 1838) was a German botanist and ornithologist.

He wrote:
with C.P. Laurop and V.F Fischer: Sylvan, ein Jahrbuch fur Forstmänner, Jäger und Jagdfreunde (1813 to 1822);
with E. Lindemann: Flora der deutschen Ostseeprovinzen Esth-, Liv- und Kurland. Mitau, Leipzig (1839);
with A. Bunge: Flora von Esth-, Liv- und Kurland. Mitau, Leipzig (1853).

Fleischer described the lesser kestrel in 1818, naming it naumanni for his friend Johann Andreas Naumann.

1797 births
1838 deaths
19th-century German botanists
German ornithologists